The Aero Bravo Amazon is an ultralight aircraft from the Brazilian manufacturer Aero Bravo.

Design and development
The Amazon is an ultralight aircraft whose frame is made of aluminum tubes and planked with aluminum sheets. The two-seat cabin, which can be entered through side doors, is made of composite materials and offers 360° all-round visibility. In it, pilot and passenger sit side by side. The aircraft has a rigid nose wheel landing gear and a conventional tail unit. It is powered by a 74 kW Rotax 912 ULS four-cylinder boxer engine.

Specifications

See also
Aero Bravo 700
Aero Bravo Patriot
Flyer F600 NG

References

Bibliography

External links
Photo on Jetphoto.com

2010s Brazilian ultralight aircraft
ultralight aircraft
Single-engined tractor aircraft
Aircraft first flown in 2014